The military dictatorship in Brazil occasionally referred to as the Fifth Brazilian Republic, was a governmental structure established on 1 April 1964, after a coup d'état by the Brazilian Armed Forces, with support from the United States government, against President João Goulart. The Brazilian dictatorship lasted for 21 years, until 15 March 1985. The military coup was fomented by José de Magalhães Pinto, Adhemar de Barros, and Carlos Lacerda (who had already participated in the conspiracy to depose Getúlio Vargas in 1945), then governors of the states of Minas Gerais, São Paulo, and Guanabara, respectively. The coup was planned and executed by the most senior commanders of the Brazilian Army and received the support of almost all high-ranking members of the military, along with conservative elements in society, like the Catholic Church and anti-communist civil movements among the Brazilian middle and upper classes. The United States State Department supported the coup through Operation Brother Sam and thereafter supported the regime through its embassy in Brasilia.

Despite initial pledges to the contrary, the military regime enacted in 1967 a new, restrictive Constitution, and stifled freedom of speech and political opposition. The regime adopted nationalism, economic development, and anti-communism as its guidelines.

The dictatorship reached the height of its popularity in the 1970s with the so-called "Brazilian Miracle", even as the regime censored all media, and tortured and exiled dissidents. João Figueiredo became president in March 1979; in the same year he passed the Amnesty Law for political crimes committed for and against the regime. While combating the "hardliners" inside the government and supporting a re-democratization policy, Figueiredo could not control the crumbling economy, chronic inflation and concurrent fall of other military dictatorships in South America. Amid massive popular demonstrations in the streets of the main cities of the country, the first free elections in 20 years were held for the national legislature in 1982. In 1985, another election was held, this time to elect (indirectly) a new president, being contested between civilian candidates for the first time since the 1960s, being won by the opposition. In 1988, a new Constitution was passed and Brazil officially returned to democracy. Since then, the military has remained under the control of civilian politicians, with no official role in domestic politics.

Brazil's military government provided a model for other military regimes and dictatorships throughout Latin America, being systematized by the so-called "Doctrine of National Security", which "justified" the military's actions as operating in the interest of national security in a time of crisis, creating an intellectual basis upon which other military regimes relied. In 2014, nearly 30 years after the regime collapsed, the Brazilian military recognized for the first time the excesses committed by its agents during the years of the dictatorship, including the torture and murder of political dissidents. In May 2018, the United States government released a memorandum, written by Henry Kissinger, dating back to April 1974 (when he was serving as Secretary of State), confirming that the leadership of the Brazilian military regime was fully aware of the killing of dissidents. It is estimated that 434 people were either confirmed killed or went missing (not to be seen again) and 20,000 people were tortured during the military dictatorship in Brazil. While some human rights activists and others assert that the true figure could be much higher, and should include thousands of indigenous people who died because of the regime's negligence, the armed forces have always disputed this.

Background

Brazil's political crisis stemmed from the way in which the political tensions had been controlled in the 1930s and 1940s during the Vargas Era. Vargas' dictatorship and the presidencies of his democratic successors marked different stages of Brazilian populism (1930–1964), an era of economic nationalism, state-guided modernization, and import substitution trade policies. Vargas' policies were intended to foster an autonomous capitalist development in Brazil, by linking industrialization to nationalism, a formula based on a strategy of reconciling the conflicting interests of the middle class, foreign capital, the working class, and the landed oligarchy.

Essentially, this was the epic of the rise and fall of Brazilian populism from 1930 to 1964: Brazil witnessed over the course of this time period the change from export-orientation of the First Brazilian Republic (1889–1930) to the import substitution of the populist era (1930–1964) and then to a moderate structuralism of 1964–80. Each of these structural changes forced a realignment in society and caused a period of political crisis. Period of right-wing military dictatorship marked the transition between populist era and the current period of democratization.

The Brazilian Armed Forces acquired great political clout after the Paraguayan War. The politicization of the Armed Forces was evidenced by the Proclamation of the Republic, which overthrew the Empire, or within Tenentismo (Lieutenants' movement) and the Revolution of 1930. Tensions escalated again in the 1950s, as important military circles (the "hard-line militars", old positivists whose origins could be traced back to the AIB and the Estado Novo) joined the elite, medium classes and right-wing activists in attempts to stop Presidents Juscelino Kubitschek and João Goulart from taking office, due to their supposed support for Communist ideology. While Kubitschek proved to be friendly to capitalist institutions, Goulart promised far-reaching reforms, expropriated business interests and promoted economical-political neutrality with the US.

After Goulart suddenly assumed power in 1961, society became deeply polarized, with the elites fearing that Brazil would, like Cuba, join the Communist Bloc, while many thought that the reforms would boost greatly the growth of Brazil and end its economical subservience with the US, or even that Goulart could be used to increase the popularity of the Communist agenda. Influential politicians, such as Carlos Lacerda and even Kubitschek, media moguls (Roberto Marinho, Octávio Frias, Júlio de Mesquita Filho), the Church, landowners, businessmen, and the middle class called for a coup d'état by the Armed Forces to remove the government. The old "hard-line" army officers, seeing a chance to impose their positivist economic program, convinced the loyalists that Goulart was a communist menace.

Goulart and the fall of the Fourth Republic

After the presidency of Juscelino Kubitschek, the right wing opposition elected Jânio Quadros, who based his electoral campaign on criticizing Kubitschek and government corruption. Quadros' campaign symbol was a broom, with which the president would "sweep away the corruption." In his brief tenure as president, Quadros made moves to resume relations with some communist countries, made some controversial laws and law proposals, but without legislative support, he couldn't follow his agenda.

In the last days of August 1961, Quadros tried to break the impasse by resigning from the presidency, apparently with the intention of being reinstated by popular demand. João Goulart was vice president. He was a member of the Brazilian Labour Party and has been active in politics since the Vargas Era. As Quadros resigned, Goulart was outside the country visiting China. At that time Brazil's president and vice president were elected from different party tickets. Some military top brass tried to prevent Goulart from assuming the presidency, accusing him of being communist, but the legalist campaign in support of Goulart was already strong. The crisis was solved by the "parliamentarian solution" - an arrangement that decreased the powers of the president by creating a new post of prime minister, which was filled by Tancredo Neves and instituting a Parliamentary republic.

Brazil returned to Presidential government in 1963 after a referendum, and, as Goulart's powers grew, it became evident that he would seek to implement "base reforms" (bottom-up reforms) such as land reform and nationalization of enterprises in various economic sectors (which would remove the nation from its antiquated latifundial economy). The reforms were considered communist. Goulart sought to implement the reforms regardless of assent from established institutions such as Congress. Goulart had low parliamentarian support, due to the fact that his centrist attempts to win support from both sides of the spectrum gradually came to alienate both. Over time, Goulart was forced to shift well to the left of his mentor Getúlio Vargas and was forced to mobilize the working class and even the peasantry amid falling urban bourgeois support. The core of Brazilian populism was economic nationalism, and that was no longer appealing to the middle classes.

On 1 April 1964, after a night of conspiracy, rebel troops made their way to Rio de Janeiro, considered a legalist bastion. São Paulo's and Rio de Janeiro's generals were convinced to join the coup. To prevent a civil war, and in knowledge that the US would openly support the army, the President fled first to Rio Grande do Sul, and then went to exile in Uruguay, where his family owned large estates.

United States involvement

The US Ambassador Lincoln Gordon later admitted that the embassy had given money to anti-Goulart candidates in the 1962 municipal elections, and had encouraged the plotters; many extra United States military and intelligence personnel were operating in four United States Navy oil tankers and the aircraft carrier USS Forrestal, in an operation code-named Operation Brother Sam. These ships had positioned off the coast of Rio de Janeiro in case Brazilian troops required military assistance during the 1964 coup. A document from Gordon in 1963 to US president John F. Kennedy also describes the ways João Goulart should be put down, and his fears of a communist intervention supported by the Soviets or by Cuba.

Washington immediately recognized the new government in 1964, and hailed the coup d'état as one of the "democratic forces" that had allegedly staved off the hand of international communism. American mass media outlets like Henry Luce's Time magazine also gave positive remarks about the dissolution of political parties and salary controls at the beginning of Castello Branco mandate.

Brazil actively participated in the CIA-backed state terror campaign against left-wing dissidents known as Operation Condor.

The alleged communist threat
The argument used to justify the establishment of a military dictatorship in the country was the imminence of a "communist threat" in 1964. The historian  disputes the assertion that communism was of sufficient strength in Brazil to threaten the democratic system in 1964. In an interview, Motta said:

Instead, Motta asserts that the assertion of a "communist threat" was fabricated to unify the Brasilian armed forces and increase their support among the general population.

Moreover, the communist armed struggles only appeared after the implementation of the dictatorship, and not before it, and in fact never put Brazilian democracy at risk.

Divisions within the officer corps
The armed forces' officer corps was divided between those who believed that they should confine themselves to their barracks, and the hard-liners who regarded politicians as willing to turn Brazil to communism. The victory of the hard-liners dragged Brazil into what political scientist Juan J. Linz called "an authoritarian situation." However, because the hard-liners could not ignore the counterweight opinions of their colleagues or the resistance of society, they were unable to institutionalize their agenda politically. In addition, they did not attempt to eliminate liberal constitutionalism because they feared disapproval of international opinion and damage to their alignment with the United States. The United States as bastion of anticommunism during the Cold War, provided the ideology that the authoritarians used to justify their hold on power. Washington also preached liberal democracy, which forced the authoritarians to assume the contradictory position of defending democracy, while destroying it. Their concern for appearances caused them to abstain from personal dictatorship by requiring each successive general-president to hand over power to his replacement.

Establishing the regime, Castelo Branco

The Army could not find a civilian politician acceptable to all of the factions that supported the ouster of João Goulart.
On 9 April 1964 coup leaders published the First Institutional Act, which greatly limited the freedoms of the 1946 constitution. The president was granted authority to remove elected officials from office, dismiss civil servants, and revoke for 10 years the political rights of those found guilty of subversion or misuse of public funds. On 11 April 1964 the Congress elected the Army Chief of Staff, Marshal Humberto de Alencar Castelo Branco as president for the remainder of Goulart's term.

Castelo Branco had intentions of overseeing a radical reform of the political-economic system and then returning power to elected officials. He refused to remain in power beyond the remainder of Goulart's term or to institutionalize the military in power. However, competing demands radicalized the situation. Military "hard-line" wanted a complete purge of left-wing and populist influences while civilian politicians obstructed Castelo Branco's reforms. The latter accused him of hard-line actions to achieve his objectives, and the former accused him of leniency. On 27 October 1965, after victory of opposition candidates in two provincial elections, he signed the Second Institutional act which purged Congress, removed objectionable state governors and expanded president's arbitrary powers at the expense of the legislative and judiciary branches. This gave him the latitude to repress the populist left but also provided the subsequent governments of Artur da Costa e Silva (1967–69) and Emílio Garrastazu Médici (1969–74) with a "legal" basis for their hard-line authoritarian rule.

Castelo Branco, through extra-constitutional decrees dubbed "Institutional Acts" ( or "AI"), gave the executive the unchecked ability to change the constitution and remove anyone from office ("AI-1") as well as to have the presidency elected by Congress. A two-party system was created - the ruling government-backed National Renewal Alliance (ARENA) and the mild not-leftist opposition Brazilian Democratic Movement (MDB) party ("AI-2"). In the new Constitution of 1967 the name of the country was changed from United States of Brazil to Federative Republic of Brazil.

Hardening of the regime, Costa e Silva

Castelo Branco was succeeded to the presidency by General Artur da Costa e Silva who was representative of hard-line elements of the regime. On 13 December 1968 he signed the Fifth Institutional Act that gave president dictatorial powers, dissolved Congress and state legislatures, suspended the constitution, and imposed censorship. On 31 August 1969 Costa e Silva suffered a stroke. Instead of his vice-president all state power was assumed by military junta, which then chose General Emílio Garrastazu Médici as the new president.

Years of Lead, Médici 

A hardliner, Médici sponsored the greatest human rights abuses of the time period. During his government, persecution and torture of dissidents, harassment against journalists and press censorship became ubiquitous. The succession of kidnappings of foreign ambassadors in Brazil embarrassed the military government. The anti-government manifestations and the action of guerrilla movements generated an increase in repressive measures. Urban guerrillas from Ação Libertadora Nacional and Revolutionary Movement 8th October were suppressed, and military operations undertaken to finish the Araguaia Guerrilla War.

The "ideological frontiers" of Brazilian foreign policy were reinforced. By the end of 1970, the official minimum wage went down to US$40/month, and the more than one-third of Brazilian workforce which had their wages tied to it lost about 50% of its purchasing power in relation to the 1960 levels of the Juscelino Kubitschek administration.

Nevertheless, Médici was popular, as his term was met with the largest economic growth of any Brazilian President, the Brazilian Miracle unfolded and the country won the 1970 Football World Cup. In 1971 Médici presented the First National Development Plan aimed at increasing the rate of economic growth especially in remote Northeast and Amazonia. The results of his economic policy consolidated the option for the national-development model. Because of these results, the country's foreign economic connections were transformed, allowing its international presence to be broadened.

In November 1970 federal, state, and municipal elections were held. Most of the seats were won by ARENA candidates. In 1973, an electoral college system was established and in January 1974 General Ernesto Geisel was elected to be the next president.

Resistance

The fall of João Goulart worried many citizens. Many students, Marxists, and workers formed groups that opposed military rule. A minority of these adopted direct armed struggle, while most supported political solutions to the mass suspension of human rights. In the first few months after the coup, thousands of people were detained, while thousands of others were removed from their civil service or university positions.

In 1968 there was a brief relaxation of the nation's repressive politics. Experimental artists and musicians formed the Tropicalia movement during this time. However, some of the major popular musicians Gilberto Gil and Caetano Veloso, for instance were arrested, imprisoned, and exiled. Chico Buarque left the country, in self-proclaimed exile.

The first signs of resistance to this repression were seen with the appearance of widespread student protests. In response, the government issued the Fifth Institutional Act in December 1968, which suspended habeas corpus, closed Congress, ended democratic government, and instituted other repressive features.

In 1969 the Revolutionary Movement 8th October kidnapped Charles Burke Elbrick, the U.S. ambassador to Brazil. The resistance fighters demanded the release of imprisoned dissidents who were being cruelly tortured in exchange for Ambassador Elbrick. The government responded by adopting more brutal measures of counter-insurgency, leading to the assassination of Carlos Marighella, a guerrilla leader, two months after Elbrick's kidnapping. This marked the beginning of the decline of armed opposition. In 1970, Nobuo Okuchi, Japanese consul general in Sāo Paulo, was kidnapped, while Curtis C. Cutter, U.S. consul in Porto Alegre, was wounded in the shoulder but escaped kidnapping. Also in 1970, Ehrenfried von Holleben, West German Ambassador, was kidnapped in Rio and one of his bodyguards was killed.

Repression 

After the military coup, the new government put forward a series of measures to strengthen its rule and weaken the opposition. The complex structure of the state's repression reached several areas of Brazilian society, and involved the implementation of measures of censorship, persecutions, and violations of human rights.

The systematic repression during this period in the Brazilian history was dependent on and alternated between the so-called “moderates” (“moderados”) and “hard-liners” (“linha dura”) in power. The most aggressive set of repressive measures took place during the period between 1968 and 1978, called the Years of Lead (Anos de Chumbo). The repressive characteristic of the regime, however, was present in the Brazilian society throughout the military rule.

Censorship 

The mainstream media, initially in pair with the military intervention at the coup's eve, later became contrary to the government and thus under heavy censorship rules. The management of all sectors of national communication was overseen by the Special Counsel of Public Relations (Assessoria Especial de Relações Públicas) created in the beginning of 1968 while censorship was institutionalized through the Higher Counsel of Censorship (Conselho Superior de Censura) later on that same year.

The Higher Counsel of Censorship was overseen by the Ministry of Justice, which was in charge of analyzing and revising decisions put forward by the director of the Federal Cops department. The ministry also was responsible for establishing guidelines and norms to implement censorship at local levels. Institutionalized censorship affected all areas of communication in Brazilian society:- newspaper, television, music, theater, and all industries related to mass communication activities, including marketing companies.

Despite the regime's efforts to censor any and all pieces of media that could hurt the government, the population found ways to get around it as much as possible. Even though artists and journalists had to have permission from the counsel to publish any piece of communication, they sometimes were able to surpass censorship barriers through unconventional ways. Musicians would rely on word play to publish songs with veiled criticisms towards the government while famous newspapers would fill in empty spaces left blank due to censored articles with random cake recipes, a way to indicate to the population the government's involvement with their publication.

Human rights violations

As early as 1964, the military government was already using the various forms of torture it devised systematically to not only gain information it used to crush opposition groups, but to intimidate and silence any further potential opponents. This radically increased after 1968.

While other dictatorships killed more people, Brazil saw the widespread use of torture, as it also had during the dictatorship of Getúlio Vargas; Vargas's enforcer Filinto Müller has been named the "patron of torturers" in Brazil. Advisors from the United States and United Kingdom trained Brazilian forces in interrogation and torture. To extinguish its left-wing opponents, the dictatorship used arbitrary arrests, imprisonment without trials, kidnapping, and most of all, torture, which included rape and castration. The book Torture in Brazil provides accounts of only a fraction of the atrocities committed by the government.

The military government murdered hundreds of others, although this was done mostly in secret and the cause of death often falsely reported as accidental. The government occasionally dismembered and hid the bodies.

French General Paul Aussaresses, a veteran of the Algerian War, came to Brazil in 1973. General Aussaresses used "counter-revolutionary warfare" methods during the Battle of Algiers, including the systemic use of torture, executions and death flights. He later trained U.S. officers and taught military courses for Brazil's military intelligence. He later acknowledged maintaining close links with the military.

So far nobody has been punished for these human rights violations, because of the 1979 Amnesty Law written by the members of the government who stayed in place during the transition to democracy. The law grants amnesty and impunity to any government official or citizen accused of political crimes during the dictatorship. Because of a certain "cultural amnesia" in Brazil, the victims have never garnered much sympathy, respect, or acknowledgement of their suffering.

Work is underway to alter the Amnesty Law, which has been condemned by the Inter-American Court of Human Rights. The National Truth Commission was created in 2011 attempting to help the nation face its past and honor those who fought for democracy, and to compensate the family members of those killed or disappeared. Its work was concluded in 2014. It reported that under military regime at least 191 people were killed and 243 "disappeared". The total number of deaths probably measures in the hundreds, not reaching but could be nearing one thousand, while more than 50,000 people were detained and 10,000 forced to go into exile.

According to the Comissão de Direitos Humanos e Assistência Jurídica da Ordem dos Advogados do Brasil, the "Brazilian death toll from government torture, assassination and 'disappearances' for 1964–81 was [...] 333, which included 67 killed in the Araguaia guerrilla front in 1972–74". According to the Brazilian Army 97 military and civilians were killed by terrorist and guerrilla actions made by leftist groups during the same period.

In a 2014 report by Brazil's National Truth Commission which documented the human rights abuses of the military government, it was noted that the United States "had spent years teaching the torture techniques to the Brazilian military during that period."

Geisel administration, distensão, and the 1973 oil shock

It was in this atmosphere that retired General Ernesto Geisel (1974–79) was elected to Presidency with Médici's approval. Geisel was a well-connected Army General and former president of Petrobras.

There had been intense behind-the-scenes maneuvering by the hard-liners against him and by the more moderate supporters of Castelo Branco for him. Fortunately for Geisel, his older brother, Orlando Geisel was the Minister of Army, and his close ally, General João Baptista de Oliveira Figueiredo, was chief of Médici's military staff. Once in power, Geisel adopted a more moderate stance with regards to political opposition than his predecessor Médici.

Decompression policy

Although not immediately understood by civilians, Ernesto Geisel's accession signaled a move toward a less oppressive rule. He replaced several regional commanders with trusted officers and labeled his political programs abertura (opening) and distensão (decompression), meaning a gradual relaxation of authoritarian rule. It would be, in his words, "the maximum of development possible with the minimum of indispensable security."

Together with his Chief of Staff, Minister Golbery do Couto e Silva Geisel devised a plan of gradual, slow democratization that would eventually succeed despite all the threats and opposition from hard-liners.

However, the torture of the regime's left-wing and Communist opponents by DOI-CODI was still ongoing as demonstrated by the murder of Vladimir Herzog.

Geisel allowed opposition Brazilian Democratic Movement (MDB) to run an almost free election campaign before November 1974 elections and MDB won more votes than ever.

When opposition MDB party won more seats in 1976 Congress elections, Geisel in April 1977 used powers granted to him by AI-5, dismissed Congress and introduced a new package of laws (April Package), that made gubernatorial elections indirect and created an electoral college for electing the next president, thus safeguarding ARENA positions.

In 1977 and 1978 the presidential succession issue caused further political confrontation with the hard-liners. In October 1977 he suddenly dismissed the far-right Minister of Army, General Sylvio Couto Coelho da Frota who had tried to become candidate for the next president.

In May 1978 Geisel had to deal with the first labor strikes since 1964. 500 000 workers, led by the future President Luiz Inacio Lula da Silva, demanded and won 11% wage increase.

By the end of his Presidency Geisel had allowed exiled citizens to return, restored habeas corpus, repealed the extraordinary powers, in December 1978 ended the Fifth Institutional Act, and imposed General João Figueiredo (1979–85) as his successor in March 1979.

Economy

President Geisel sought to maintain high economic growth rates of the Brazilian Miracle which were tied to maintaining the prestige of the regime, even while seeking to deal with the effects of the 1973 oil crisis. Geisel removed long-time Minister of Finance Antônio Delfim Netto. He maintained massive state investments in infrastructure—highways, telecommunications, hydroelectric dams, mineral extraction, factories, and atomic energy. All this required more international borrowing and increased state's debt.

Fending off nationalist objections, he opened Brazil to oil prospecting by foreign firms for the first time since the early 1950s. He also tried to reduce Brazil's reliance on oil, by signing a US$10 billion agreement with West Germany to build eight nuclear reactors in Brazil. During this time ethanol production program was promoted as an alternative to gasoline and the first ethanol fueled cars were produced.

Brazil suffered drastic reductions in its terms of trade as a result of the 1973 oil crisis. In the early 1970s, the performance of the export sector was undermined by an overvalued currency. With the trade balance under pressure, the oil shock led to a sharply higher import bill. Thus, the Geisel government borrowed billions of dollars to see Brazil through the oil crisis. This strategy was effective in promoting growth, but it also raised Brazil's import requirements markedly, increasing the already large current-account deficit. The current account was financed by running up the foreign debt. The expectation was that the combined effects of import substitution industrialization and export expansion eventually would bring about growing trade surpluses, allowing the service and repayment of the foreign debt.

Brazil shifted its foreign policy to meet its economic needs. "Responsible pragmatism" replaced strict alignment with the United States and a worldview based on ideological frontiers and blocs of nations. Because Brazil was 80% dependent on imported oil, Geisel shifted the country from uncritical support of Israel to a more neutral stance on Middle Eastern affairs. His government also recognized the People's Republic of China and the new socialist governments of Angola and Mozambique, both former Portuguese colonies. The government moved closer to Latin America, Europe, and Japan.

Brasil's intention to build nuclear reactors with West Germany's help created tensions with the US which did not want to see a nuclear Brazil. After election of Carter a greater emphasis was put on the human rights. The new Harkin Amendment limited American military assistance to countries with human rights violations. Brazilian right-wingers and military viewed this as incursion on Brazilian sovereignty and Geisel renounced any future military aid from United States in April 1977.

Transition to democracy, Figueiredo

President João Figueiredo steered the country back to democracy and promoted the transfer of power to civilian rule, facing opposition from hardliners in the military. Figueiredo was an Army General and former head of the secret service, National Intelligence Service of Brazil.

As president, he continued the gradual "abertura" (democratization) process that was begun in 1974. An amnesty law, signed by Figueiredo on 28 August 1979, amnestied those convicted of "political or related" crimes between 1961 and 1978. In the early 1980s, the military regime could no longer effectively maintain the two-party system established in 1966. The Figueiredo administration dissolved the government-controlled National Renewal Alliance Party (ARENA) and allowed new parties to be formed. The President was often incapacitated by illness and took two prolonged leaves for health treatment in 1981 and 1983, but the civilian vice president Antônio Aureliano Chaves de Mendonça did not enjoy major political power.

In 1981 the Congress enacted a law on restoration of direct elections of state governors. The general election of 1982 brought a narrow victory to ARENA's successor, pro-government Democratic Social Party (43.22% of the vote), while the opposition Brazilian Democratic Movement Party received 42.96% of votes. The governorship of three major states, São Paulo, Rio de Janeiro and Minas Gerais, was won by the opposition.

However, the political developments were overshadowed by increasing economic problems. As inflation and unemployment soared, the foreign debt reached massive proportions making Brazil the world's biggest debtor owing about US$90 billion to international lenders. The austerity program imposed by the government brought no signs of recovery for the Brazilian economy.

In 1984, Diretas Já demonstrators took over the country and epitomized the newly regained freedoms of assembly and expression, but the movement's primary objective was not attained, and the 1985 presidential election was held indirectly, via selected electoral college. The opposition vigorously struggled for passing a constitutional amendment that would allow direct popular presidential elections in November 1984, but the proposal failed to win passage in the Congress. Opposition's candidate Tancredo Neves succeeded Figueiredo when Congress held an election for the new president.

Foreign relations

During this period Brazil's international agenda incorporated new perceptions. With nationalist military — who were State-control devotees — in power, there was increased energy for questioning the disparities of the international system. Interest in expanding state presence in the economy was accompanied by policies intended to transform Brazil's profile abroad. The relationship with the United States was still valued, but policy alignment was no longer total. Connections between Brazilian international activity and its economic interests led foreign policy, conducted by foreign minister José de Magalhães Pinto (1966–67), to be labeled "Prosperity Diplomacy."

This new emphasis of Brazil's international policy was followed by an appraisal of relations maintained with the United States in the previous years. It was observed that the attempted strengthening of ties had yielded limited benefits. A revision of the Brazilian ideological stand within the world system was added to this perception. This state of affairs was further enhanced by the momentary relaxation of the bipolar confrontation during détente.

In this context, it became possible to think of substituting the concept of limited sovereignty for full sovereignty. Development was made a priority for Brazilian diplomacy. These conceptual transformations were supported by the younger segments of Itamaraty (Ministry of External Relations), identified with the tenets of the independent foreign policy that had distinguished the early 1960s.

Based on the priorities of its foreign policy, Brazil adopted new positions in various international organizations. Its performance at the II Conference of the United Nations Conference on Trade and Development (UNCTAD) in 1968, in defense of non-discriminatory and preferential treatment for underdeveloped countries' manufactured goods, was noteworthy. The same level of concern distinguished the Brazilian stand at the Economic Commission for Latin America (ECLA) meeting in Viña del Mar (1969). On this occasion, Brazil voiced its support of a Latin American union project.

In the security sphere, disarmament was defended and the joint control system of the two superpowers condemned. Brazil was particularly critical of the Nuclear Non-Proliferation Treaty, with a view to guarantee the right to develop its own nuclear technology. This prerogative had already been defended previously, when the Brazilian government decided not to accept the validity of the Treaty for the Prohibition of Nuclear Weapons (TNP) in Latin America and the Caribbean. Brazil's position on the TNP became emblematic of the negative posture that it would, from then onwards, sustain regarding the power politics of the United States and the Soviet Union. Its initial detailing was influenced by the presence of João Augusto de Araújo Castro as ambassador to the UN and president of the Security Council in the years 1968–69. Brazil tried to strengthen its position with nuclear cooperation negotiated settlements with countries such as Israel (1966), France (1967), India (1968) and the United States (1972).

The changes in Brazilian diplomacy were to be also reflected in other matters on the international agenda, such as the moderate stance taken with regard to the "Six-Day War" between Arabs and Israelis. In the multilateral sphere, the country championed the cause of the reform of the United Nations Organization charter.

The expansion of Brazil's international agenda coincided with the administrative reform of the Ministry of External Relations. Its move to Brasília in 1971 was followed by internal modernization. New departments were created, responding to the diversification of the international agenda and the increasing importance of economic diplomacy. Examples include the creation of a trade promotion system (1973) and the Alexandre de Gusmão Foundation (1971) to develop studies and research foreign policy.

Foreign policy during the Gibson Barboza mandate (1969–74) united three basic positions. The first one, ideological, defended the existence of military governments in Latin America. To achieve that, the Organization of American States fought terrorism in the region. The second one criticized the distension process between the two superpowers, condemning the effects of American and Soviet power politics. The third requested support for development, considering that Brazil, with all its economic potential, deserved greater responsibility within the international system.

New demands and intentions appeared, related to the idea that the nation was strengthening its bargaining power in the world system. At international forums, its main demand became "collective economic security". The endeavor to lead Third World countries made Brazil value multilateral diplomacy. Efforts in this direction can be observed at the UN Conference on Environment (1972), the GATT meeting in Tokyo (1973) and the Law of the Sea Conference (1974).

This new Brazilian stance served as a base for the revival of its relationship with the United States. Differentiation from other Latin American countries was sought, to mean special treatment from the United States. Nevertheless, not only was this expectation not fulfilled but military assistance and the MEC-USAID educational cooperation agreement were interrupted.

Washington held itself aloof at the time of President Médici's visit to the United States in 1971. In response, especially in the military and diplomatic spheres, nationalist ideas were kindled and raised questions about the alignment policy with the United States.

The presence of J.A. de Araújo Castro as ambassador to Washington contributed to the re-definition of relations with the American government. The strategic move was to try to expand the negotiation agenda by paying special attention to the diversification of trade relations, the beginning of nuclear cooperation, and the inclusion of new international policy themes.

In 1971 the military dictatorship helped rig Uruguayan elections, which Frente Amplio, a left-wing political party, lost. The government participated in Operation Condor, which involved various Latin American security services (including Pinochet's DINA and the Argentine SIDE) in the assassination of political opponents.

During this period, Brazil began to devote more attention to less-developed countries. Technical cooperation programs were initiated in Latin America and in Africa, accompanied in some cases by State company investment projects – in particular in the fields of energy and communication. With this pretext, an inter-ministerial system was created by Itamaraty and the Ministry of Planning, whose function it was to select and coordinate international cooperation projects. To foster these innovations, in 1972 foreign minister Gibson Barboza visited Senegal, Togo, Ghana, Dahomey, Gabon, Zaïre, Nigeria, Cameroon and Côte d'Ivoire.

However, the prospect of economic interests and the establishment of cooperation programs with these countries was not followed by a revision of the Brazilian position on the colonial issue. Traditional loyalty was still towards Portugal. Attempts were made to consolidate the creation of a Portuguese-Brazilian community.

Timeline
 April 1964 - the coup.
 October 1965 - political parties abolished, creation of two party system.
 October 1965 - Presidential elections to be indirect.
 January 1967 - a new Constitution.
 March 1967 - Costa e Silva takes office.
 November 1967 - opposition starts armed resistance.
 March 1968 - beginning of student protests.
 December 1968 - Institutional Act Nr.5.
 September 1969 - Medici selected as president.
 October 1969 - a new Constitution.
 January 1973 - armed resistance suppressed.
 June 1973 - Medici announces Geisel as his successor.
 March 1974 - Geisel takes office.
 August 1974 - political relaxation announced.
 November 1974 - MDB wins in Senate elections.
 April 1977 - National Congress dismissed.
 October 1977 - Head of the Armed Forces dismissed.
 January 1979 - Institutional Act Nr. 5 dismissed.
 March 1979 - Figueiredo takes office.
 November 1979 - two party system of ARENA and MDB ended.
 November 1982 - opposition wins Lower house of Parliament.
 April 1984 - amendment for direct presidential elections defeated.
 March 1985 - José Sarney takes office.

See also
1964 Brazilian coup d'état
Corinthians Democracy
Films depicting Latin American military dictatorships
History of ethanol fuel in Brazil
Nuclear activities in Brazil
Operation Condor
Volkswagen do Brasil
List of the killed and politically disappeared people during the Brazilian military dictatorship

References

Sources

Further reading
The Politics of Military Rule in Brazil 1964-1985, by Thomas E. Skidmore (1988).
The Political System of Brazil: Emergence of a "Modernizing" Authoritarian Regime, 1964–1970, by Ronald M. Schneider (1973).
The Military in Politics: Changing Patterns in Brazil, by Alfred Stepan (1974).
Brazil and the Quiet Intervention: 1964, by Phyllis R. Parker (1979).
Mission in Mufti: Brazil's Military Regimes, 1964–1985, by Wilfred A. Bacchus (1990).
Eroding Military Influence in Brazil: Politicians Against Soldiers, by Wendy Hunter (1997).
Brazil, 1964-1985: The Military Regimes of Latin America in the Cold War by Herbert S. Klein and Francisco Vidal Luna (2017).

Film documentaries
Beyond Citizen Kane by Simon Hartog (1993)

External links
Declassified documents from US Department of State and CIA about the 1964 coup

 
Military government
Military government
Military government
20th century in Brazil
Authoritarianism
Brazil
1964 establishments in Brazil
1985 disestablishments in Brazil
Anti-communism in Brazil
Far-right politics in Brazil